The R40 was a New York City Subway car model built by the St. Louis Car Company from 1967 to 1969 for the IND/BMT B Division. There were 400 cars in the R40 fleet, arranged in married pairs. Two versions of the R40 were manufactured: the original 200-car R40 order built in 1967–1968, and the supplementary 200-car R40A order built in 1968–1969. The 200 original R40s and the first 100 R40As were unique for their futuristic 10-degree slanted end (designed by the firm Raymond Loewy and Associates) and were nicknamed the R40 Slants or simply Slants.

The first R40s entered service on March 23, 1968. Various modifications were made over the years to the R40 fleet, including a complete redesign to the last 100 R40As. In 1987–1989, the R40s and R40As were rebuilt by Sumitomo Corp. of America. The R160 subway car order replaced all of the R40s and R40As from 2007 to 2009; the last slant-ended train ran on June 12, 2009, while the last straight-ended R40As ran on August 28, 2009. After being retired, most R40s and R40As were sunk into the ocean as artificial reefs, but a pair of R40 slants and several straight-ended R40As have survived.

Description
There were two versions of the R40: the original order from 1967 to 1968, and the second order, the R40As, built from 1968 to 1969. The R40s were originally numbered 4150–4249 and 4350–4449. In 1970, cars 4350–4449 were renumbered to 4250–4349. The slant-ended R40As were originally numbered 4450–4549, and the straight-ended R40As were originally numbered 4250–4349; these cars were later renumbered to 4350–4449 and 4450–4549, respectively.

The R40s and first 100 of the R40As were unique for their futuristic 10-degree slanted end (designed by the firm Raymond Loewy and Associates and William Snaith Inc.) and were nicknamed the R40 Slants or simply Slants. This was intended to beautify the subway, and thus, making it more attractive to car users. However, the New York City Transit Authority found great dangers, along with other hazards and flaws, with the slanted end design having the lack of handholds for riders walking between cars raising concerns of passengers falling onto the tracks. The doors between cars were closed to prevent accidents as a temporary solution. Within months, the cars were retrofitted for $215,000 with large grab rails, and pantograph gates mounted, which effectively destroyed Loewy's design, but allowed passengers to travel safely between cars. In addition to modifying the R40s and slant-ended R40As, the last 100 R40As were built with a modified straight-ended version designed by Sundberg-Ferar (nicknamed the R40M), a form that was used on all other subway cars.

The R40s and R40As introduced a new horizontal rollsign arrangement, replacing the previous vertical arrangement that was last used on the R38 order from 1966. Located on the upper part of the middle set of windows, the new arrangement displayed the route bullet on one side and the line's terminal stations on the other side. In addition, the No.1 ends of the cars now featured a single rollsign, located on the opposite side of the driver's cabin, that displayed only the route bullet. This replaced the overhead twin rollsigns that displayed both the route bullet and directional terminal station. This pattern became standard for all subsequent orders, albeit with slight placement and design variations, until the R142 and R142A orders in 1999, which introduced LCD and LED signs that became standard for all New Technology Trains.

The R40As were delivered new with the same successful Stone-Safety 10 ton air conditioning systems/units found on the last ten R38 cars, and became standard equipment on all future subway cars purchased from this point onward. As a result of the air conditioning, the standee poles were arranged in an alternating pattern rather than the straight-line pattern seen in the R40s, which lacked air conditioning systems/units until their overhauls.

The R40s and slant-ended R40As were the last subway cars to feature distinctive "EXP" (express) and "LOCAL" marker lights on the No.1 ends. When the straight-ended R40As arrived, the use of these marker lights was discontinued.

History
In December 1965, the TA contracted Raymond Loewy and Associates to design a new subway car "dramatically different in exterior and interior." This design was planned to be used for 400 cars. The more attractive design was intended to get people out of their cars to use mass transit. On September 20, 1966, the TA announced plans to order 400 new subway cars with this design. The cars were to have wider doors and windows, easier-to-read signage, and interiors with light colors. Bids were opened to the public on October 1, 1966. The cost was to be split evenly between the Federal Government and the city. In November 1966, St. Louis Car Company was awarded the contract to construct 400 subway cars with the new design. The new cars cost $46,172,041.

The first incomplete pair of R40s (cars 4350–4351) came onto TA property in November 1967 for promoting the Transportation Bond issue on Election Day. It was then returned to the assembly plant in St. Louis for completion and delivered in January 1968. All 300 slanted R40s were delivered as of January 24, 1969, with the first modified R40As delivered in January 1969.

Within months of the first cars being delivered, in November 1968, the TA started modifying the slant-ended fleet at a cost of $400,000. A union newspaper reported that the modifications were necessary because "there is reason to believe" the cars would be deformed if they bumped, and because the slanted ends posed a danger to passengers traveling between cars. Meanwhile, the director of design from Raymond Loewy claimed that there was to be no passage between subway cars; the doors were to be locked and thus the safety features would have been unneeded. Because of the safety concerns, conductors were asked to lock the doors at the slanted ends of each car.

In 1977, pantograph gates, salvaged from retired R1 through R9 cars, were modified and then installed on the front ends of the straight-ended R40A and R42 cars. Since the straight-ended R40As came factory equipped with baloney coiled spring type inter car safety barriers on their blind ends, they did not need such installations that the R42s received.

Pairs 4200–4201 were badly damaged by a rear-end accident on the North Channel Bridge on September 12, 1970, and 4420–4421 were damaged on February 12, 1974, when they were rear-ended by R6 # 1236, which also suffered extensive damage as well after its handbrakes failed at Church Avenue station on the southbound express track between 7th Ave and Church Ave. They were all scrapped in 1983 prior to the overhaul of the R40s and R40As due to damage sustained in the above accidents during the 1970s.

Overhaul and mishaps
In 1987–1989, the R40s and R40As were rebuilt by Sumitomo Corp. of America in Elmira Heights, New York. The interior was changed drastically, and the MTA paint band was removed on all rebuilt cars. The R40s were retrofitted with air conditioning, and all cars received a new interior design. Distinctive "EXP" (express) and "LOCAL" marker lights on the slant-ended cars were also removed.

Cars 4259, 4260, 4427, and 4428 were all involved in accidents after their overhaul. All cars except 4259 were scrapped; however, 4259 never returned to service and was ultimately sunken as an artificial reef along with most other R40s and R40As. Cars 4258 and 4261 as well as cars 4426 and 4429, all of which had lost their mates, were mated as pairs.

On June 5, 1995, R42 number 4664 was rear-ended by straight-ended R40A number 4461 on the Williamsburg Bridge. The R42 was written off as it had sustained major damage, while the R40A was repaired and rebuilt into a slant-ended car. It was temporarily numbered 4260, as it was intended to be mated to R40 number 4259. Meanwhile, straight-ended R40A number 4460 and R42 number 4665 became paired with each other. This pair today survives as part of the museum fleet.

Retirement
The R160 subway car order replaced all of the R40s and R40As from 2007 to 2009. The straight-ended R40As were retired starting in January 2009 until August 28, 2009, when the last pair ran on the  along with four R42 pairs.

After retirement, most cars were stripped and sunk as artificial reefs in the Atlantic Ocean. The last R40/R40A cars to be removed from property by barge were R40 4272 and straight-ended R40As 4474–4475, which were reefed on April 17, 2010.  However, R40 pair 4162–4163 and slant-ended R40A pairs 4392–4393 and 4442–4443 were retained as school cars until 2013. These cars were eventually decommissioned and trucked to Sims Metal Management in Newark, New Jersey, from April 2013 to October 1, 2013, for scrapping, as the reefing program had ended in April 2010.

R40s 4280–4281 (originally 4380–4381) are preserved for the New York Transit Museum. They were restored to operating status in 2013–2014 and have been operating on New York City Transit Museum-sponsored excursions since August 2014, specifically on the Train of Many Metals (TOMM). Before cars 4280–4281 were selected for preservation, cars 4192–4193 were temporarily displayed at the New York Transit Museum in 2008, but they were later stripped and reefed.

In addition to the R40 pair, several straight-ended R40As have survived. The full list includes:
 4460 (and its R42 mate 4665) – preserved by the Railway Preservation Corporation and stored at Coney Island Yard.
 4461 (rebuilt into a slant-ended car and renumbered to 4260) – currently at the Randall's Island FDNY Facility, used with R62s 1366 and 1370 as training cars.
 Pair 4480–4481 – preserved by the New York Transit Museum. The cars were stored at the Concourse Yard until 2014, when they were moved to the 207th Street Yard.

References

Further reading
 Sansone, Gene. Evolution of New York City subways: An illustrated history of New York City's transit cars, 1867–1997. New York Transit Museum Press, New York, 1997

External links

 nycsubway.org – NYC Subway Cars: R40
 Car Status/Assignment
 R40 Roster and Scrap Notes

Train-related introductions in 1967
R040
St. Louis multiple units